Miguel Ángel Palacio García (born 3 March 1949 in Ganzo (Torrelavega) is a Spanish politician. He served as the President of the Parliament of Cantabria from 2003 to 2011, and was succeeded by José Antonio Cagigas.

References

Presidents of the Parliament of Cantabria
Members of the Parliament of Cantabria
1949 births
Living people